Marc Rosset was the defending champion, but  lost to Chuck Adams in the semifinal.Alexander Volkov won in the final 6–2, 6–4 against Chuck Adams.

Seeds

Draw

Finals

Top half

Bottom half

External links
 Draw

Kremlin Cup
Kremlin Cup